Destin Makumbu (born 4 August 1982) is an English former professional footballer who played as a defender in the United States, Sweden and Norway.

Makumbu played in the Tottenham Hotspur youth system. In 2001, he moved to the United States where he joined the Milwaukee Rampage of the USL A-League. In 2003, he moved to Sweden and signed with Bodens BK. He played five seasons with Boden before moving to Norwegian club Kongsvinger for one season. In August 2008, Makumbu moved to Mo IL.

Personal life
Makumbu is of Congolese descent.

References

External links

1982 births
Living people
English footballers
Milwaukee Rampage players
Bodens BK players
Kongsvinger IL Toppfotball players
USL First Division players
English expatriate footballers
Black British sportspeople
English sportspeople of Democratic Republic of the Congo descent
Expatriate footballers in Norway
Association football defenders
English expatriate sportspeople in the United States
Expatriate soccer players in the United States